The 2000 du Maurier Open men's doubles was the men's doubles event of the one hundred and eleventh edition of the Canadian Open; a WTA Tier I tournament and the most prestigious men's tennis tournament held in Canada. Jonas Björkman and Patrick Rafter were the defending champions, but Rafter chose not to participate, and only Bjorkman competed that year. Bjorkman partnered with Max Mirnyi, but lost in the semifinals to Joshua Eagle and Andrew Florent. Sébastien Lareau and Daniel Nestor won in the final 6–3, 7–6(3), against Joshua Eagle and Andrew Florent.

Seeds

Draw

Finals

Top half

Bottom half

External links
Draw
Qualifying Draw

Men's Doubles